Carlos Enrique Calderón Anaya (born January 18, 1986 in San Salvador, El Salvador) is a Salvadoran football player.

Club career
Calderón started his career at Atlético Marte and moved to Luis Ángel Firpo in August 2004. He played for Luis Ángel Firpo in the 2008–09 CONCACAF Champions League Group Stage. He was loaned back for 6 months to Marte in 2009 but injury deprived him from playing too many games so Marte released him. In November 2010 he suffered a knee injury while playing for Marte Soyapango, which kept him out for another few months.

International career
Calderón made his debut for El Salvador in an August 2007 friendly match against Honduras and has, as of January 2011, earned a total of 4 caps, scoring no goals. His most recent international was an October 2007 friendly match against Trinidad & Tobago.

References

External links

1986 births
Living people
Sportspeople from San Salvador
Salvadoran footballers
El Salvador international footballers
C.D. Atlético Marte footballers
C.D. Luis Ángel Firpo footballers
Association football forwards